Zita Pleštinská (born Zita Kányai on 13 June 1961 in Nitra)
is a Slovak politician and current mayor of the village of Chmeľnica. Pleštinská is a former
Member of the European Parliament
with the Slovenská demokratická a kresťanská únia,
part of the European People's Party. She was on
the European Parliament's Committee on the Internal Market and Consumer Protection and Committee on Women's Rights and Gender Equality, and also served as a substitute for the Committee on Regional Development, as a member of the
Delegation to the EU-Ukraine Parliamentary Cooperation Committee and as a
substitute for the Delegation for relations with Australia and New Zealand.

Education
 1985: Technical University of Budapest, Faculty of Architecture
 1993:	The Certificate in professional expertise in the regional development
 2000:	SPP diploma (Special Preparatory Programme for Structural Funds)
 2001:	Cooperation and preparation of PHARE projects
 2002:	The Certificate in professional expertise in regional management, public and concession procurement

Career
 1985-1991: Chief Architect's Department in Stará Ľubovňa - Deputy Director
 1991-1996: District Office of the Environment in Stará Ľubovňa -  Head of Department for Regional Planning and Land Engineering
 1996-1998: District Office in Stará Ľubovnňa - Officer at the Environmental Department
 1998-2002: District Office in Stará Ľubovňa - Deputy Director
 2002-2004: District Office in Stará Ľubovňa - Director; Head of Department of Regional Development
 2002-2006: Municipality Chmeľnica - Mayor (1st Term)
 2004–2009: The European Parliament - Member
 2010: District Office in Stará Ľubovňa - Director
 Present: Municipality Chmeľnica - Mayor

Political Activity
 1991-2000: KDH (Christian Democratic Movement)
 1998-2000: SDK (Slovak Democratic Coalition)
 2000–present: SDKÚ-DS (Slovak Democratic and Christian Union - Democratic Party) - Member of the Slovak board of SDKÚ, Member of regional union of SDKÚ Prešov

See also
 2004 European Parliament election in Slovakia

External links
 http://www.plestinska.sk
 Mayor of Chmelnica

External links
 
 

1961 births
Living people
Hungarians in Slovakia
Politicians from Nitra
Slovak Democratic and Christian Union – Democratic Party MEPs
MEPs for Slovakia 2004–2009
MEPs for Slovakia 2009–2014
Women MEPs for Slovakia
Members of the National Council (Slovakia) 2020-present
Female members of the National Council (Slovakia)